Patrick Galbraith and Anders Järryd were the defending champions, but Galbraith chose not to participate, and only Jarryd competed that year.
Jarryd partnered with John Fitzgerald, but lost in the first round to Marc-Kevin Goellner and David Prinosil.

Marc-Kevin Goellner and David Prinosil won in the final 6–2, 6–7, 7–6, against Paul Haarhuis and Mark Koevermans.

Seeds

  John Fitzgerald /  Anders Järryd (first round)
  Tom Nijssen /  Cyril Suk (quarterfinals)
  Paul Haarhuis /  Mark Koevermans (final)
  Jim Grabb /  Jan Siemerink (quarterfinals)

Draw

Draw

External links
Draw
Scores (with tie-breaks)

Doubles
1992 ATP Tour